Richland High School is a secondary school located in North Richland Hills, Texas.  The school includes grades 9 through 12, and is part of the Birdville Independent School District.

Background
Richland High School opened in 1961 as the second high school in the Birdville Independent School District. The school colors and emblem of blue and gray, the Confederate flag and mascot of the Rebels was chosen by students and approved by the Birdville School Board.  The school was expanded over time to meet the needs of the community, including a major expansion in the late 1980s that added a new main entrance, classroom wing, cafeteria, and administration offices.

A 2006 bond package funded a nearly-complete demolition of the original school. Only the original auditorium, the band hall, and a wing added in the late 1980s (including the library and cafeteria) were retained, while the rest of the structure was demolished and replaced with student parking. A brand-new facility was built in the old student parking area, connected to the remnants of the original structure. The new school opened for the 2009-2010 school year.

During the 2008-2009 school year, Richland High School introduced its first Advancement Via Individual Determination class. The program graduated its first group of seniors in May 2012.

Mascot
In June 2020, the BISD board of trustees voted to remove the Rebel mascot and related Confederate symbols, including the Richland Rebel flag, the Dixie Belles, and Johnny Reb, as a result of a petition calling for their removal signed by over 25,000 people and amid the George Floyd protests. On July 23, 2020 it was announced that the new Richland mascot is the Royals.

Notable alumni
 Kelly Blackwell (Class of 1987), former NFL player
 Kambri Crews (Class of 1989), comedic storyteller and author
 Wendy Davis (Class of 1981), State senator for District 10 in the Texas State Senate
 Trent Grisham (Class of 2015), professional baseball player in Major League Baseball (MLB)
 Jake Kemp (Class of 2003), radio host at 1310 The Ticket
 Craig Lancaster (Class of 1988), writer and journalist
 Gary Morris (Class of 1967), singer and stage actor

References

External links
Richland High School
Birdville Independent School District

1961 establishments in Texas
Birdville Independent School District high schools
Educational institutions established in 1961
North Richland Hills, Texas